George Guțiu (March 30, 1924 – May 8, 2011) was a bishop of the Romanian Greek-Catholic Church.

Ordained to the priesthood in 1948, Guțiu was appointed bishop of the Greek Catholic Diocese of Cluj-Gherla, Romania and retired in 2002.

Notes

Romanian Greek-Catholic bishops
1924 births
2011 deaths
Eastern Catholic bishops in Romania